William Arthur Morgan (26 November 1864 – 3 April 1934) was an English cricketer. He was born at Liverpool, Lancashire.

A club cricketer who played for both Sefton and Stanley, Morgan was selected to play for Liverpool and District in a first-class match against Yorkshire in 1889. He scored 2 runs in the Liverpool and District first-innings, before being dismissed by Bobby Peel, while in their second-innings he was dismissed by Saul Wade. Morgan batted at number three, though his batting style is unknown. In what was his only appearance in first-class cricket, Yorkshire won by an innings and 41 runs.

He died  at Cosham, Hampshire on 3 April 1934.

References

External links
William Morgan at ESPNcricinfo
William Morgan at CricketArchive

1864 births
1934 deaths
Cricketers from Liverpool
English cricketers
Liverpool and District cricketers